Wendell Gale Catlett (born October 31, 1940) is a retired American basketball coach who was head coach at the University of Cincinnati and West Virginia University.

Playing career
Born in Hedgesville, West Virginia, Catlett played for West Virginia from 1958 to 1963. He played on the freshman team in 1958–59, but missed the 1959–60 season with a broken wrist. During his three varsity seasons (1960–61 through 1962–63), he helped the Mountaineers to two NCAA tournament berths. West Virginia went 24–4, 24–6 and 23–8 during Catlett's varsity seasons and won the Southern Conference title every season. The 6-foot-5 forward totaled 407 points and 275 rebounds on Coach George King's guard-oriented teams.

Assistant coach
After completing his senior season in 1963, Catlett immediately turned to coaching. He got a job as an assistant coach at the University of Richmond under head coach Lew Mills, then at Davidson College in 1965 under Lefty Driesell, Kansas from 1967 to 1971 under Ted Owens, and finally Kentucky under Adolph Rupp in the 1971–72 season.

Head coach
In 1972, Gale Catlett was named head coach of University of Cincinnati, succeeding Tay Baker, whose team had gone 17–9 the year before. In Catlett's first season, 1972–73, the Bearcats were also 17–9, and they improved to 19–8 the following year. It was the 1974–75 season that Catlett and the Bearcats reached national prominence. Led by a crop of highly touted recruits including Pat Cummings, Brian Williams, Robert Miller, Mike Jones, Gary Yoder and Steve Collier, the Bearcats were 23–6 and advanced to the NCAA Midwest Regional semifinals. By 1975–76, the team won the Metro Conference, posted a 25–6 record and were expected to make a deep run into the tournament, but the Bearcats were upset in the first round on a last-second tip-in by Notre Dame. During the three seasons from 1974–75 through 1976–77, the Bearcats were consistently ranked in the AP Poll, reaching as high as #2 in January 1977. That season, the Bearcats were 25–5 and again won the Metro Conference, but they were again ousted in the first round of the NCAA tournament.

In six seasons at Cincinnati, Catlett posted a record of 126–44 (a .741 winning percentage). He left Cincinnati after a 17–10 season and under a cloud after the basketball program was penalized by the NCAA for numerous recruiting violations during his tenure.

In 1978, he took over the head coaching job at West Virginia. During the decade before his arrival, the Mountaineers were 116–121. Over the next 24 seasons, he posted a 439–276 record. Catlett's West Virginia teams won an average of 19 games a season and made eight trips to the NCAA tournament, including a 1998 Sweet 16 appearance, where they upset a highly touted Cincinnati team.

On February 13, 2002, at age 61, Catlett announced his retirement. He had a career college coaching record of 565–320.

In the year of 1997, Gale Catlett was nominated as the Big East Coach of the Year, but failed to win as John MacLeod took that honor.

In late 2005 he publicly stated that he was considering running in the 2006 Republican primary in order to challenge incumbent Democratic Senator Robert Byrd. He later declined to run.

Head coaching record

References 

1940 births
Living people
American men's basketball coaches
American men's basketball players
Basketball coaches from West Virginia
Basketball players from West Virginia
Cincinnati Bearcats men's basketball coaches
College men's basketball head coaches in the United States
Davidson Wildcats men's basketball coaches
Kansas Jayhawks men's basketball coaches
Kentucky Wildcats men's basketball coaches
People from Hedgesville, West Virginia
Richmond Spiders men's basketball coaches
West Virginia Mountaineers men's basketball coaches
West Virginia Mountaineers men's basketball players
Forwards (basketball)